Arvid Thörn (13 February 1911 – 2 December 1986) was a Swedish football forward who played for Sweden in the 1934 FIFA World Cup. He also played for IFK Grängesberg.

References

External links
 
 
 

1911 births
1986 deaths
Swedish footballers
Sweden international footballers
Association football forwards
1934 FIFA World Cup players